Daniel Jacob Calichman (born February 21, 1968) is an American soccer coach and retired player. He played as a defender and is an assistant coach for Major League Soccer club LA Galaxy.

Playing career

College
Calichman played college soccer at Williams College, where he was a three-time NCAA Division III All-American.

Professional
Calichman began his professional career in Japan, first for Mazda in the Japan Soccer League in 1990 and 1991, and then for its successor Sanfrecce Hiroshima in the newly formed J. League Division 1 in 1992 and 1993. Calichman became the first American to play in the J-League. In 1995, he moved back to the United States and played for Boston Storm and New York Centaurs in the A-League.

In 1996, Calichman was allocated to Los Angeles Galaxy of Major League Soccer. He captained the team for three seasons, earning All-Star recognition in 1996, until a trade to New England Revolution before the 1999 season. He ended his MLS career splitting 2000 between the Revs and San Jose Earthquakes and spent 2001 in the A-League with Charleston Battery. He retired from competitive soccer at the end of the 2001 season. Calichman held the captain armband for the Earthquakes when John Doyle wasn't in the lineup.

Calichman was honored by the Galaxy in a pre-game match ceremony on April 4, 2009.

International
Calichman was capped two times for the United States national team, both in 1997.

Coaching career
In 2002, Calichman was appointed as head coach of the men's soccer team at Claremont McKenna College in Claremont, California. In 2007, Calichman also became the director of player development for Southern California-based youth soccer organization LAFC Chelsea. The club later became part of first the New York Cosmos and then the Chivas USA academy setups. From 2014 until 2020, he was an assistant coach for the Major League Soccer team Toronto FC under head coach Greg Vanney. In 2021, he moved to LA Galaxy to serve as an assistant coach.

Career statistics

Club

International

Managerial

References

External links

 
 
 

1968 births
Living people
Jewish American sportspeople
American soccer players
American soccer coaches
Soccer players from New York (state)
People from Huntington Station, New York
Williams College alumni
Association football defenders
Williams Ephs men's soccer players
Sanfrecce Hiroshima players
Boston Storm players
New York Centaurs players
LA Galaxy players
New England Revolution players
San Jose Earthquakes players
Charleston Battery players
Japan Soccer League players
J1 League players
Major League Soccer players
A-League (1995–2004) players
USISL players
United States men's international soccer players
American expatriate soccer players
Expatriate footballers in Japan
American expatriate sportspeople in Japan
Major League Soccer All-Stars
College men's soccer coaches in the United States
Chivas USA non-playing staff
Toronto FC non-playing staff
LA Galaxy non-playing staff
21st-century American Jews